John Vlismas (born 13 May 1973) is a South African stand-up comedian and entertainment promoter.

Vlismas won the 2007 South African Comedy Award for best stand-up comedian of the year and was a finalist in the 2008 Yuk Yuk's Great Canadian Laugh Off.

In 2010, Vlismas was in the comedy film Outrageous with fellow South African comedians, Barry Hilton, Joey Rasdien, Loyiso Gola, Mark Banks, Riaad Moosa, and Krijay Govender – the only female in the cast.

In April 2014, Vlismas was part of the panel at Comedy Central Africa's Roast of Kenny Kunene and Steve Hofmeyr.

See also
 List of stand-up comedians

References

External links 

 John Vlismas on Myspace
 
 TVSA Actor Profile: John Vlismas

South African male comedians
Living people
1973 births